Marshall County is a county located on the north central border of the U.S. state of Mississippi. As of the 2020 census, the population was 33,752. Its county seat is Holly Springs. The county is named for Chief Justice of the United States John Marshall, who presided in the early nineteenth century.

Marshall County is part of the Memphis, TN-MS-AR Metropolitan Statistical Area.

Geography

Major highways
  Interstate 22
  Interstate 269
  U.S. Route 72
  U.S. Route 78
  Mississippi Highway 4
  Mississippi Highway 7
  Mississippi Highway 302

Adjacent counties
 Fayette County, Tennessee (north)
 Benton County (east)
 Union County (southeast)
 Lafayette County (south)
 Tate County (southwest)
 DeSoto County (west)
 Shelby County, Tennessee (northwest)

National protected area
 Holly Springs National Forest (part)

Demographics

2020 census

As of the 2020 United States Census, there were 33,752 people, 12,772 households, and 8,832 families residing in the county.

2010 census
As of the 2010 United States Census, there were 37,144 people living in the county. 50.1% were White, 46.9% Black or African American, 0.2% Native American, 0.2% Asian, 1.7% of some other race and 0.8% of two or more races. 3.2% were Hispanic or Latino (of any race).

2000 census
At the 2000 census, there were 34,993 people, 12,163 households and 9,110 families living in the county. There were 13,252 housing units at an average density of 19 per square mile (7/km2). The racial makeup of the county was 50.36% Black or African American, 48.37% White, 0.17% Native American, 0.11% Asian, 0.01% Pacific Islander, 0.37% from other races, and 0.62% from two or more races. 1.21% of the population were Hispanic or Latino of any race.

According to the census of 2000, the largest ancestry groups in Marshall County were African 50.36%, English 31.87%, Scottish 7.1%, Scots-Irish 3.13%, Irish 1.2% and Welsh 1.1%

There were 12,163 households, of which 34.30% had children under the age of 18 living with them, 49.60% were married couples living together, 20.10% had a female householder with no husband present, and 25.10% were non-families. 22.00% of all households were made up of individuals, and 7.90% had someone living alone who was 65 years of age or older. The average household size was 2.74 and the average family size was 3.19.

Age distribution was 26.60% under the age of 18, 11.80% from 18 to 24, 28.60% from 25 to 44, 22.00% from 45 to 64, and 11.10% who were 65 years of age or older. The median age was 34 years. For every 100 females there were 98.00 males. For every 100 females age 18 and over, there were 96.50 males.

The median household income was $28,756, and the median family income was $33,125. Males had a median income of $28,852 versus $21,227 for females. The per capita income for the county was $14,028. About 18.00% of families and 21.90% of the population were below the poverty line, including 28.70% of those under age 18 and 23.10% of those age 65 or over.

Communities

City 
 Holly Springs (county seat and largest municipality)

Towns
 Byhalia
 Potts Camp

Census-designated places
 Bethlehem
 Mount Pleasant
 Red Banks
 Victoria
 Waterford

Unincorporated communities

 Barton
 Cayce
 Chulahoma
 Hudsonville
 Marianna
 Matthews Corner
 Orion
 Slayden
 Wall Hill
 Warsaw
 Watson

Politics
Democratic presidential candidates have carried the county in every election since 1976. The smallest percentage margin since then was in 2020, when Joseph Biden won the county by 3.1% over incumbent Donald Trump. Former President Trump was supported by 47.8% of the county voters in 2020 and 44.4% in 2016. Trump did not win the popular vote nationally in those elections, either, receiving 46.9% in 2020 and 46.1% in 2016, but won the necessary electoral college votes in the latter.

See also

 National Register of Historic Places listings in Marshall County, Mississippi

References

External links
 Official website of Marshall County
 McAlexander/Marshall County Collection (MUM00287) owned by the University of Mississippi, Archives and Special Collections.

 
Mississippi counties
Counties in the Memphis metropolitan area
Counties of Appalachia
1836 establishments in Mississippi
Populated places established in 1836
Majority-minority counties in Mississippi